Lise Marie Gautreau (-Robichaud) (born April 29, 1967 in Moncton, New Brunswick) is a Canadian rhythmic gymnast.

Lise Gautreau competed for Canada in the rhythmic gymnastics individual all-around competition at the 1988 Summer Olympics in Seoul. There she tied for 32nd place in the preliminary (qualification) round and did not advance to the final.

References

External links 
 Lise Gautreau at Sports-Reference.com

1967 births
Living people
Canadian rhythmic gymnasts
Gymnasts at the 1988 Summer Olympics
Olympic gymnasts of Canada
Sportspeople from Moncton